Andrew Michael Edgar Seeley (born April 30, 1982) is a Canadian actor, singer, songwriter and dancer. He has recorded many songs for the Walt Disney Company. He danced as a child in Ontario until he was about preteen age and then moved to Florida.

Early and personal life
Seeley grew up in Toronto and fell in love with performing. He was once part of a boy band called Nu Ground. He was cast in Hal Prince's revival of Showboat and stayed with the production for a year. In 2005, Seeley started working with Ray Cham, an established producer and together they wrote "Get'cha Head in the Game", a song that was a nominee in the Creative Arts Primetime Emmy category, Best Original Music and Lyrics.

Seeley is married to actress/comedian Amy Paffrath. The couple has one child, a daughter, who was born in 2019.

Career

2005–2010: Breakthrough films and debut album

In 2005, Seeley began working with founded producer Ray Cham and together they wrote "Get'cha Head in the Game" for Disney's quadruple platinum High School Musical soundtrack. This garnered them an Emmy nomination in the Best Original Music and Lyrics category. He also auditioned alongside Zac Efron for the role of Troy Bolton in the first High School Musical film, to which Efron won the part while Seeley acted as the character's singing voice, which was blended with Efron's voice in post-production. In addition, Seeley filled in for Efron (who could not join the tour due to a scheduling conflict with the shooting of the 2007 film adaptation of the Broadway musical Hairspray) on the North America and Latin America tours of High School Musical: The Concert, playing in 60,000 seat arenas and he can be heard on both soundtracks and High School Musical on Stage!.

Seeley's association with Disney continued and he can be heard as a featured artist on several Disney soundtracks/compilation albums including Disneymania 5, Disneymania 6, Disney Channel Holiday, Radio Disney Jams, Vol. 9, and Byou. Drew's duet with Spanish-born Mexican singer Belinda "Dance with Me", from the platinum Cheetah Girls 2 soundtrack, was played on the Disney Channel and on Radio Disney. Drew appeared in Belinda's video of "Ni Freud ni tu mamá". Drew also made a guest appearance on the 2008 Chipmunks CD Undeniable, singing an updated take on "Shake Your Groove Thing" with Alvin and the gang. Seeley appeared in the Hallmark Channel Movie Claire opposite Valerie Bertinelli, and in the film Fly Kidz, for which he co-wrote and produced the soundtrack. He also wrote and performed music for the Disney Channel Original Movie Jump In! starring Corbin Bleu and Keke Palmer.

Seeley starred opposite Selena Gomez and Jane Lynch in Another Cinderella Story, playing the pop star Joey Parker. Drew wrote and performed four songs in the film, and shot music videos for both versions of his hit song, "New Classic". Seeley also appeared in the Disney Channel Original Movie Stuck in the Suburbs as a hotel employee.

In the summer of 2009 he starred as Prince Eric in the Disney Broadway Musical The Little Mermaid, and had a leading role in the horror movie The Shortcut. In June 2010, Seeley starred in the Hallmark Channel television movie Freshman Father.

2011–present: The Resolution, films and television
Seeley's album The Resolution was released on April 5, 2011. In support of the album, Drew went on a national tour where he  performed his own original music. He also sang a song for the Disney Channel original series Shake It Up. A duet with Adam Hicks, "Dance for Life," premiered in the episode "Vatalihoosit It Up", backed by a routine performed by dance crew the Jabbawockeez. "Dance for Life" was featured on the soundtrack for the show, Shake It Up: Break It Down. Seeley's song "It's Always Been You" was used as the theme of Crown for Christmas, a 2011 Hallmark Channel movie.

On June 12, 2011, Seeley was reported to have joined the CW's hit teen drama series 90210, but Entertainment Weekly later reported that he dropped the role due to a conflict with his schedule. In March 2012, I Kissed a Vampire was released, in which Seeley stars alongside Lucas Grabeel and Adrian Slade. In June 2012, he co-starred in the Lifetime movie, "Talhotblond", playing young "Tommy". Seeley has also released music videos for his song "Beautiful", and most recently "Into The Fire". Drew recorded a song for the third Shake It Up soundtrack Shake It Up: I Love Dance, called "I Do". It featured on Walmart-exclusive editions as a bonus track. The song was also featured in the Shake It Up season 3 episode, "I Do It Up".

In 2013, Seeley began filming his role in a new film, Elixir, which was renamed Lovestruck: The Musical on ABC Family. Seeley played the role of "Young Ryan". He played opposite Chelsea Kane (Young Harper), Jane Seymour (Harper), Sara Paxton (Mirabella), Tom Wopat (Ryan), and Alexander DiPersia (Marco).  He is featured singing his rendition of Usher's "DJ's Got Us Fallin’ in Love". In conjunction with the new movie, Seeley co-wrote and performed "Here & Now," the theme song to ABC Family's spring promotional campaign. The song was featured on Seeley's dance-pop EP released in April 2013. In 2014, Seeley performed as "Bob Gaudio" in Jersey Boys for the US tour.

Filmography

Film

Television

Web

Stage

Discography

Studio albums
 ~DS~ (2006)
 The Resolution (2011)
 Downtime (2018)

Awards and nominations

References

External links
 Podcast about his marriage proposal to his wife Amy
 

1982 births
Canadian male dancers
Canadian male film actors
Canadian male soap opera actors
Canadian male television actors
Canadian songwriters
Lake Brantley High School alumni
Living people
Male actors from Ottawa
Musicians from Ottawa
21st-century Canadian male actors
21st-century Canadian male singers